Angelucci can be:

 Orfeo Angelucci, mid-1950s contactee who claimed to be in contact with extraterrestrials
 Gilberto Angelucci, a retired Venezuelan football goalkeeper
 Jonathan Angelucci, an Australian  football (soccer) player
 Liborio Angelucci (1746–1811), an Italian physician and politician
 Marc Angelucci (1968–2020), an American attorney and murder victim